Fenstanton is a village and civil parish in Cambridgeshire, England,  south of St Ives in Huntingdonshire, a non-metropolitan district of Cambridgeshire and  historic county. Fenstanton lies on the south side of the River Ouse.

Known as Stantun in the 11th century, Staunton and Stanton Gisbrit de Gant in the 13th century, the name Fenstanton (and Fennystanton) appeared from the 14th century. The name "Fenstanton" means "fenland stone enclosure".

History

Lying on the Via Devana, the Roman road that linked the army camps at Godmanchester and Cambridge, Fenstanton was the site of a Roman villa, possibly designed to keep order after an attack on the forces of the IX Legion Hispana, as they retreated from an ambush at Cambridge by Boudicca's tribesmen. The first example of a Roman crucifixion in UK was discovered in a burial in Fenstanton in 2017, when a skeleton of a man was found with a nail through his heel. In 2021, the bones were unearthed.

The inhabitants of Fenstanton  rose in support of Hereward the Wake. From his stronghold on the Isle of Ely Hereward led resistance against the Normans causing King William I to assemble a force in Cambridge to deal with the problem. Men were summoned from Huntingdon but they did not pass Fenstanton and escaped with their lives only by swimming across the river.

Fenstanton was listed in the Domesday Book in the Hundred of Toseland in Huntingdonshire; the name of the settlement was written as Stantone in the Domesday Book. In 1086 there was just one manor at Fenstanton; the annual rent paid to the lord of the manor in 1066 had been £17 and the rent had fallen to £16 in 1086, and the parish contained 33 households. By 1086 there was already a church and a priest at Fenstanton.

Government
As a civil parish, Fenstanton has a parish council consisting of twelve councillors. The second tier of local government is Huntingdonshire District Council which is a non-metropolitan district of Cambridgeshire and has its headquarters in Huntingdon. Fenstanton is a district ward and is represented on the district council by one councillor. The highest tier of local government is Cambridgeshire County Council which has administration buildings in Alconbury. Fenstanton is part of the electoral division of The Hemingfords and Fen Stanton and is represented on the county council by one councillor.

Fenstanton was in the historic and administrative county of Huntingdonshire until 1965. From 1965, the village was part of the new administrative county of Huntingdon and Peterborough. Then in 1974, following the Local Government Act 1972, Fenstanton became a part of the county of Cambridgeshire.

At Westminster, Fenstanton is in the parliamentary constituency of Huntingdon, and elects one Member of Parliament by the first past the post system of election. Since 2001 the MP has been Jonathan Djanogly of the Conservative Party.

Demography

Population
In the period 1801 to 1901 the population of Fenstanton was recorded every ten years by the UK census.  During this time the population was in the range of 704 (the lowest was in 1801) and 1120 (the highest was in 1861).

From 1901, a census was taken every ten years with the exception of 1941 (due to the Second World War).

All population census figures from report Historic Census figures Cambridgeshire to 2011 by Cambridgeshire Insight.

Culture and community
The village supports two public houses: The Crown and Pipes and the Duchess. In 1851 there were eight recorded pubs: The Bell, the Crown, the George, the King William IV, the Rose & Crown, the Royal Oak, the White Horse, Woolpack and the Duchess.

There is a post office, as well as a primary school, shared with neighbouring Hilton.

Fenstanton is the current operating base of Stagecoach in Huntingdonshire.

Notable people
The village is the ancestral home of John Howland, one of the Pilgrims who arrived on the Mayflower in 1620 at Plymouth, Massachusetts.

In the 18th century Lancelot "Capability" Brown, the famous landscape gardener, bought the Lordship of the Manor of Fenstanton and Hilton from the Earl of Northampton. Brown and his wife Bridget are buried in the parish churchyard and the chancel bears a memorial to them and two of their sons, John and his wife Mary and Lancelot Brown Junior with his wife Frances memorialised across the nave.

The antiquary M. R. James wrote a ghost story entitled The Fenstanton Witch, which was not published till after his death. The story also mentions the village of Lolworth, which is a few miles away.

Religious sites
The parish church of St Peter and St Paul dates from the 13th century, though there was an earlier church on the site listed in the Domesday Survey.

The octagonal spire on the west tower dates from the 14th century, and the church is noted for its chancel, built by 14th-century rector William de Longthorne. The east window, 17 feet in width, is impressive for a church of its size. The six bells date from the 17th and 18th century, the latest being hung in 1981, a gift from The Howland Society in America, descendants of the Mayflower Pilgrims mentioned above.

The village also has both a Baptist and a United Reformed Church.

References

Further reading
Dady, Jack. (2000) Beyond Yesterday: A History of Fenstanton. Huntingdon: Archived Books. See village website

External links

Village website
Capability Brown's unfinished garden
Capability Brown Festival 2016

 
Villages in Cambridgeshire
Huntingdonshire
Civil parishes in Cambridgeshire